In mathematics, Chow's theorem may refer to a number of theorems due to Wei-Liang Chow:
 Chow's theorem: The theorem that asserts that any analytic subvariety in projective space is actually algebraic.
 Chow–Rashevskii theorem: In sub-Riemannian geometry, the theorem that asserts that any two points are connected by a horizontal curve.

See also 
 Chow's lemma
 Chow's moving lemma

Zhou, Weiliang